Mecca is an unincorporated community located in Riverside County, California, United States. The desert community lies on the north shore of the Salton Sea in the eastern Coachella Valley and is surrounded by agricultural land.

Geography and climate
Situated within the Colorado Desert, Mecca's climate is that of an arid desert (BWh), which experiences an average 90 °F temperature. Low temperatures can reach into the 20 °F range. The community sits below 150 feet under sea level on the edge of the Salton Sea, formerly the Salton Sink.

Land developers intending to irrigate the desert with water from the Colorado River did not foresee excess snow melt and for two years from 1905–1906 accidentally re-routed the entirety of the river to the Salton Sink, flooding the salt mines that had been a source of salt for perhaps centuries and giving rise to the Salton Sea. Groundwater and water transported via the Coachella Canal have transformed the desert environment into large swaths of agricultural land.

Demographics

The 2020 United States census reported a population of 8,219 for the year, a decline from 2010.

The 2010 United States census reported that Mecca had a population of 8,577. The racial makeup of Mecca was 2,686 (31.3%) White, 40 (0.5%) African American, 47 (0.5%) Native American, 17 (0.2%) Asian, 7 (0.1%) Pacific Islander, and 237 (2.8%) from two or more races. Hispanic or Latino of any race were 8,462 persons (98.7%).

There were 1,854 households, out of which 1,374 (74.1%) had children under the age of 18 living in them, 1,185 (63.9%) were opposite-sex married couples living together, 339 (18.3%) had a female householder with no husband present, 175 (9.4%) had a male householder with no wife present. There were 142 (7.7%) unmarried opposite-sex partnerships, and 10 (0.5%) same-sex married couples or partnerships. The average household consisted of 4.63 persons per household.

The population was spread out, with 3,372 people (39.3%) under the age of 18, 1,141 people (13.3%) aged 18 to 24, 2,353 people (27.4%) aged 25 to 44, 1,368 people (15.9%) aged 45 to 64, and 343 people (4.0%) who were 65 years of age or older. The median age was 23.7 years. For every 100 females, there were 111.2 males. For every 100 females age 18 and over, there were 110.8 males.

49% of Mecca residents are employed in agricultural work. The community's population fluctuates several times throughout the course of the year with up to an additional 5,000 seasonal farmworkers coming into Mecca to serve the valley's winter and summer harvesting seasons.

Mecca has an elementary school, but no public high school. 1.4% of residents hold a college degree, with 17.7% continuing education after high school, ranking Mecca the 17th least-educated city in the United States.

Landmarks

The focal point of the community is the Mecca Family and Farm Worker's Service Center. In 1999, California Rural Legal Assistance, Inc., filed 30 complaints of discrimination against Riverside County. The U.S. Department of Housing and Urban Development investigated the complaints and determined that Riverside County's housing policies and code enforcement activities demonstrated a pattern of discrimination against Latino renters and homeowners. The County agreed to construct the Farmworker Service Center as part of a multimillion-dollar settlement agreement entered into to avoid further litigation. The Farmworker Service Center was inaugurated in 2005 and houses a health clinic, day care facility, offices for the Economic Development Department, and provides information and referrals to government services that can be accessed by the community's largely farmworker population.

Following the construction of the Farmworker Service Center, the County committed to other investments including the Mecca-North Shore Community Library and the Mecca Fire Station, both inaugurated in 2011.

Also in 2011, the Boys & Girls Club of Coachella Valley opened its biggest unit in California. Located next door to the Mecca Community Service Center, the Club presently serves c. 350 children from Mecca and surrounding areas.

Waste and landfill 
The Mecca Landfill II is located on 66th Avenue in Mecca. It handles 452,182 cubic yards of waste and has an expected closure date in 2098.

The Mecca Remediation Facility, which handles contaminated soil, is located on Gene Welmas Way in Mecca. The facility is operated by Scape Group, Inc.  Since 2009, the facility accepted contaminated soil, treated sewage sludge, soy whey, and other organic compostables. In 2011, residents' complaints of offending smells resembling rotten eggs, human waste, raw sewage, burnt motor oil, and petroleum traced back to sulfur compounds from the soy whey pond operated by Waste Reduction Technologies (WRT).

Government
In the Riverside County Board of Supervisors, Thousand Palms is in 4th District, Represented by Democrat V. Manuel Perez Supervisor of the 4th District

In popular culture

Mecca was a featured location in Roger Corman's 1966 film The Wild Angels, starring Peter Fonda, Nancy Sinatra and Bruce Dern. This film inspired the outlaw biker film genre, and marks Peter Fonda's first appearance as a biker - three years prior to Easy Rider.
Mecca was also the setting for the 1990 neo-noir film After Dark, My Sweet, directed by James Foley and starring Jason Patric, Bruce Dern, and Rachel Ward.

Susan Straight's novel, Mecca, is set in the community.

References

Further reading

External links
 
 

Census-designated places in Riverside County, California
Populated places in the Colorado Desert
Coachella Valley
Census-designated places in California